Khoji Ishan Bobo Mausoleum is a cultural heritage of Karakalpakstan. It is an architectural monument. It was built in 19th-20th century. It stands in Qipchoq Urban-type settlement of Karakalpakstan. It is considered as the property of the Karakalpakstan. It was included in the national list of real estate objects of material cultural heritage by the Government of Karakalpakistan. It is protected by the state.

References 

Mausoleums in Uzbekistan